Mala hembra ("Poor Female") is a 1950 Mexican film. It was written by Luis Alcoriza.

Cast
 Rosita Quintana		
 Ernesto Alonso		
 Rubén Rojo		
 José María Linares-Rivas		
 Beatriz Aguirre

External links
 

1950 films
1950s Spanish-language films
Mexican drama films
1950 drama films
Mexican black-and-white films
Films directed by Miguel M. Delgado
1950s Mexican films